Edgar Ochieng (born 2 November 1977) is a Kenyan footballer who was playing for Kenyan club Mathare United in the Kenyan Premier League Until his career ended.

Career
In the past he has played for Omani football club, Dhofar, in Salalah, Oman. He has also played for Sofapaka.

International career
He has played for the Kenya national football team.

References 

1977 births
Living people
Kenyan footballers
Mathare United F.C. players
Dhofar Club players
Sofapaka F.C. players
Kenya international footballers
Kenyan expatriate footballers
Kenyan expatriate sportspeople in Oman
Expatriate footballers in Oman
Association footballers not categorized by position